JBN-TV (Jesus Broadcasting Network) is a Honduran television channel dedicated to Christianity in the Spanish language. Part of the International Family Network, the channel was founded in 2000 in Tegucigalpa, Honduras.

History

Part of the International Family Network, the television channel was founded by the Manmin Central Church in the year 2000 in the city of Tegucigalpa, the capital of Honduras. JBN-TV's headquarters are in the city of San Pedro Sula, department of Cortés, Honduras.

Calendar

Currently, JBN-TV is also the Honduran satellite channel with the most coverage in international news. JBN-TV offers news, sports, lifestyle and entertainment programs including movies, documentaries, music, reviews, interviews and special events marked by the values of Christianity, and particularly refers to Manmin Central Church, an evangelical church. Founded in Seoul , South Korea , in 1982.
JBN-TV transmits through 5,000 cable television companies and 35 television channels throughout Latin America, while in Honduras it transmits with an approximate number of 700 companies throughout the country.

Diffusion

In the year 2000 JBN TV Canale 39 was founded in the city of Tegucigalpa, later it received the opportunity in 2002 to broadcast its programs throughout the country. Currently, JBN-TV has more than 35 channels in Honduras, including channel 51 in San Pedro Sula. Since May 2006, JBN-TV has been broadcasting 806 NOTICIAS via satellite, reaching more than 700 cables in Honduras and 5,000 in Latin America.
 
The open frequencies with national coverage are distributed as follows:
 
Channel 39: Tegucigalpa, MDC 
Channel 51: Valle de San Pedro Sula, Cortés  
Channel 54: La Ceiba, Tela and the department of Atlántida 
Channel 52: Danlí, Olancho and the eastern sector. 
Channel 51: Choluteca and Valle de Ángeles 
Channel 61: Quimistán Comayagua and central sector Some of its main programs are the morning magazine Buenos Dias (Good Morning) Latinoamérica, which has achieved high audience ratings in public broadcasting since 2009, and its famous international newscast and JBN News in two editions, one at 12 and another at 5 in the afternoon.

See also 

Manmin Central Church
Jaerock Lee

References

External links

JBN-TV at LyngSat Address

Television in Honduras
Television channels and stations established in 2000
Mass media in Tegucigalpa